A corridor coach is a type of railway passenger coach divided into compartments and having a corridor down one side of the coach to allow free movement along the train and between compartments.

These were first introduced, in Britain at least, around the start of the 20th century, because the advent of dining cars made it  advantageous to enable passengers to move down the length of a train. This was achieved by linking the corridors of adjacent coaches using a "corridor connector". The "Standard Corridor" thus became one of the standard mid-20th century designs of railway carriage.

The corridor coach was known on the European continent as the American system or American coach in the early 1900s.

See also
 British Rail coach type codes
 Corridor (rail vehicle)
 Soft Sleeper

References 

Passenger railroad cars

de:Abteilwagen#Abteilwagen mit Seitengang und geschützten Übergängen